Caesar Colclough (1764-1822) was Chief Justice in Court of Appeal of Newfoundland and Labrador.

References

1764 deaths
1822 deaths